New York’s 22nd congressional district is a congressional district for the United States House of Representatives currently represented by Republican Brandon Williams. Significant cities in the district include Syracuse, Utica, and Rome. It is home to several colleges and universities, including Syracuse University, Hamilton College, Colgate University, SUNY Polytechnic Institute, and Utica College. It was one of 18 districts that voted for Joe Biden in the 2020 presidential election while being won or held by a Republican in 2022.

The district consists of Madison, Oneida, and Onondaga Counties, as well as a sliver of Oswego County.

Demographics 

According to the APM Research Lab's Voter Profile Tools (featuring the U.S. Census Bureau's 2019 American Community Survey), the district as it was defined in 2020 contained about 534,000 potential voters (citizens, age 18+). Of these, 90% are White and 10% are people of color. Immigrants make up 4% of the district's potential voters. Median income among households (with one or more potential voter) in the district is about $57,200, while 13% of households live below the poverty line. As for the educational attainment of potential voters in the district, 9% of those 25 and older have not earned a high school degree, while 24% hold a bachelor's or higher degree.

Voting 

Results Under Current Lines (Since 2023)

History
2023–present:
All of Madison, Oneida, Onondaga
Parts of Oswego
2013–2023:
All of Chenango, Cortland, Madison, Oneida
Parts of Broome, Herkimer, Oswego, Tioga
2003–2012:
All of Sullivan, Ulster
Parts of Broome, Delaware, Dutchess, Orange, Tioga, Tompkins
1993–2003: 
All of Columbia, Greene, Warren, Washington
Parts of Dutchess, Essex, Rensselaer, Saratoga, Schoharie
1983–1993: 
All of Rockland
Parts of Orange, Sullivan, Westchester
1953–1983:
Parts of Bronx
1945–1953:
Parts of Manhattan
1919–1945:
Parts of Bronx, Manhattan
1913–1919:
Parts of New York

Various New York districts have been numbered "22" over the years, including areas in New York City and various parts of upstate New York. From 2003 to 2013, the district included all or parts of Broome, Delaware, Dutchess, Orange, Sullivan, Tioga, Tompkins, and Ulster counties.  It included the cities of Binghamton, Ithaca, Kingston, Middletown, Newburgh and Poughkeepsie.  The district stretched to include parts of the Finger Lakes region, the Catskill Mountains and the Hudson Valley.

List of members representing the district

1821–1833: One seat
District was created on March 9, 1821, split from the 2-seat .

1833–1843: Two seats
From 1833 to 1843, two seats were apportioned, elected at-large on a general ticket.

1843–present: One seat

Election results 
In New York State electoral politics there are numerous minor parties at various points on the political spectrum. Certain parties will invariably endorse either the Republican or Democratic candidate for every office, hence the state electoral results contain both the party votes, and the final candidate votes (Listed as "Recap").

Historical district boundaries

See also

List of United States congressional districts
New York's congressional districts
United States congressional delegations from New York

References 

 Congressional Biographical Directory of the United States 1774–present
 2008 House election data
 2004 House election data Clerk of the House of Representatives
 2002 House election data "
 2000 House election data "
 1998 House election data "
 1996 House election data "

22
Constituencies established in 1821
1821 establishments in New York (state)